Maria Bonita or María Bonita may refer to:
Maria Bonita (bandit) (1911–1938), nickname of Maria Déia, Brazilian bandit
María Bonita, a stage name of María Félix (1914–2002), Mexican actress and singer
Maria Bonita (novel), a 1914 Brazilian romance novel
Maria Bonita (film), a 1937 Brazilian film
 María Bonita (album), a 1992 album by Manuel Mijares
 María Bonita (telenovela), a 1995 Colombian telenovela
María Bonita (song) [es: María Bonita (canción)], a 1946 song composed and interpreted by Mexican composer Agustin Lara